Enrique Manuel Peña Zauner (born 4 March 2000) is a professional footballer who plays as a midfielder for Eintracht Braunschweig. Born in Germany, Peña represents Venezuela internationally.

Career
Peña Zauner made his professional debut for SV Sandhausen in the 2. Bundesliga on 27 July 2019, coming on as a substitute in the 87th minute for Mario Engels in the away match against Holstein Kiel, which finished as a 1–1 draw.

He moved to Eintracht Braunschweig in August 2021, having agreed a two-year contract.

Notes

References

External links
 
 
 

2000 births
Living people
Sportspeople from Offenbach am Main
Footballers from Hesse
Venezuelan footballers
Association football midfielders
Venezuela under-20 international footballers
German footballers
Germany youth international footballers
German people of Venezuelan descent
SV Sandhausen players
Eintracht Braunschweig players
2. Bundesliga players